Qaleh Khvajeh (also Romanized as Qal‘eh Khvājeh, Qal‘eh Khājeh, Qal‘eh Khavājeh, Qal‘eh Khwāja, Qal‘eh-ye Khvājeh, and Qal‘eh-ye Khvājū) is a village in Behnamarab-e Jonubi Rural District, Javadabad District, Varamin County, Tehran Province, Iran. At the 2006 census, its population was 1,418, in 316 families.

References 

Populated places in Varamin County